Le Lombard, known as Les Éditions du Lombard until 1989, is a Belgian comic book publisher established in 1946 when Tintin magazine was launched. Le Lombard is now part of Média-Participations, alongside publishers Dargaud and Dupuis, with each entity maintaining its editorial independence.

History 
Les Éditions du Lombard was established by Raymond Leblanc and his partners in 1946. Wanting to create an illustrated youth magazine, they decided that the already well-known Tintin would be the perfect hero. Business partner André Sinave went to see Tintin creator Hergé to propose creating the magazine. Hergé, who had worked for Le Soir during the war, was being prosecuted for having collaborated with the Germans and did not have a publisher at the time. After consulting with his friend Edgar Pierre Jacobs, Hergé agreed. The first issue of Tintin magazine was published on 26 September 1946. Simultaneously, a Dutch version was also published, entitled Kuifje (Kuifje being the name of Tintin in Dutch). 40,000 copies were printed in French, and 20,000 in Dutch.

In 1986, Le Lombard was acquired by Média-Participations, and today publishes around one hundred titles annually. More recently, in 2015, Le Lombard joined with twelve other European comics publishing actors to create Europe Comics, a digital initiative co-funded by the European Commission's Creative Europe program.

Notable titles
Alpha
Angry Birds Stella
Benoît Brisefer
Bob Morane
Buddy Longway
Chlorophylle
Chick Bill
Clifton
Crusade by writer Jean Dufaux and artist Philippe Xavier. Published in Britain by Cinebook
Cubitus
l'Élève Ducobu
I.R.$.
Lait entier
Léonard
Odilon Verjus
Ric Hochet
The Smurfs
Thorgal
 Tintin magazine
Yakari

References

External links
 Le Lombard Company website in English, French, and Dutch.

 
Belgian brands
Comic book publishing companies of Belgium
Publishing companies established in 1946
1946 establishments in Belgium